Munster versus Connacht is a rivalry that dates back to the foundation of the game in Ireland in 1879. Games between the two have occurred on an annual basis since the inception of the IRFU Interprovincial Championship in 1946. Since the beginning of the inter-provincials in 1946, Munster hold an 86–11 advantage in overall wins, with three draws. Additionally, since the inception of the Celtic League in 2001–02, Munster hold a 34–7 advantage in overall wins, with one draw in that time.

Summary of games since 1946

Statistics

Biggest wins

Munster: 67–17 (1999–2000)

Connacht: 35–14 (2015–16)

Highest scoring match

Munster 67–17 Connacht (84 points, 1999–2000)

Lowest scoring match

Munster 3–0 Connacht (3 points, 1957–58)

Most consecutive wins

Munster: 22 (1987–88 – 2003–04)

Connacht: 2 (2015–16)

Results
A history of Munster–Connacht results since the formation of the inter-provincial championship in 1946:

References

See also
IRFU Interprovincial Championship
History of rugby union matches between Leinster and Munster
History of rugby union matches between Leinster and Ulster
History of rugby union matches between Munster and Ulster

Munster
Connacht
Rugby union rivalries in Ireland
United Rugby Championship